Fritillaria pyrenaica is a species of flowering plant in the lily family Liliaceae, native to the Pyrenees in Spain and France. Common names include Pyrenean fritillary and Pyrenean snake's-head. The pendent, bell-shaped flowers are borne in spring. They have recurved tepals which are purple tinged with brown and yellow. Like other species in this genus, notably F. meleagris, they are strongly chequered.

Subspecies
Two subspecies are currently recognized:

Fritillaria pyrenaica subsp. boissieri (Costa) Vigo & Valdés

Fritillaria pyrenaica subsp. pyrenaica

Cultivation
In cultivation in the UK Fritillaria pyrenaica has gained the Royal Horticultural Society's Award of Garden Merit. It grows in any open place, such as a flower border or meadow, in full sun. Like all the Liliaceae, it is subject to predation by the scarlet lily beetle and its larvae.

References

pyrenaica
Flora of the Pyrenees
Flora of France
Flora of Spain
Garden plants
Plants described in 1753
Taxa named by Carl Linnaeus